The  is a Japanese law covering matters relating to the country's museums. The law was passed as Law No. 285 in 1951 and was last amended in 2008.

Summary
Article 2 defines museums as facilities that collect, store, research, and utilize materials on history, art, folkways, industry, and the natural sciences; as such, various types of "museum" are provided for, including botanical gardens, zoos, aquaria, and planetaria.

As of October 2018, there were 5,738 museums in Japan: 914 registered museums, 372 museum-equivalent facilities, and 4,452 museum-like facilities.

Articles
The Museum Act has 29 Articles:

Chapter 1—General Provisions (Articles 1–9)
1. Purpose of Act
2. Definition of museums
3. Activities conducted by museums
4–7. Directors, curators, qualifications, training
8–9. Standards and evaluation
Chapter 2—Registration (Articles 10–17)
10. Registration
11. Application
12. Examination
13. Amendment
14. Cancellation
15. Abolition of museums
16. Prefectural regulations
17. deleted
Chapter 3—Public Museums (Articles 18–26)
18. Establishment
19. Jurisdiction (governed by the local board of education) 
20–22. Museum councils
23. Admission fees
24,26. Subsidies
25. deleted
Chapter 4—Private Museums (Articles 27–28)
27. Relationship with prefectural boards of education
28. Relationship with central and local governments
Chapter 5—Other Provisions (Article 29)
29. Facilities equivalent to museums
Supplementary Provisions

See also
 1950 Law for the Protection of Cultural Properties
 Independent Administrative Institution National Institute for Cultural Heritage
 Prefectural museum
 List of museums in Japan
  (JAM)

References

External links
  Museum Act (UNESCO Database of National Cultural Heritage Laws)
  Present Status of Museums in Japan (Agency for Cultural Affairs; includes an English translation of the Museum Act)
  Museum Act (e-gov.go.jp)
  Museums (Agency for Cultural Affairs)

Japanese legislation
Museums in Japan
1951 in law